Sárszentlőrinc is a village in Tolna county, Hungary founded in 1722.

References

Populated places in Tolna County